Feruza Sadikova is an Uzbekistani taekwondo practitioner. She won one of the bronze medals in the women's lightweight event at the 2022 World Taekwondo Championships held in Guadalajara, Mexico. She won the gold medal in the women's 62 kg event at the 2021 Islamic Solidarity Games held in Konya, Turkey.

References

External links
 

Living people
Year of birth missing (living people)
Place of birth missing (living people)
Uzbekistani female taekwondo practitioners
Islamic Solidarity Games medalists in taekwondo
Islamic Solidarity Games competitors for Uzbekistan
World Taekwondo Championships medalists
Asian Taekwondo Championships medalists
21st-century Uzbekistani women